Hide Away, also known as A Year in Mooring, is a 2011 American psychological drama film directed and co-produced by Chris Eyre. It stars Josh Lucas as a successful businessman attempting to resurrect his life, with Ayelet Zurer, Jon Tenney, Taylor Nichols, and James Cromwell in supporting roles.

The film had its world premiere at the South by Southwest Film Festival on March 12, 2011. It received a limited theatrical release in the United States on May 25, 2012.

Cast
 Josh Lucas as The Young Mariner
 Ayelet Zurer as The Waitress
 James Cromwell as The Ancient Mariner
 Jon Tenney as The Divorced Man
 Taylor Nichols as The Boss
 Casey LaBow as Lauren
 Anne Faba as Helen
 Austin Bickel as Owen
 Ele Bardha as The Buyer
 David Herbst as The Seller
 Bryan Crough as The Curmudgeon
 Taylor Groothuis as Young Lauren

Reception

Critical response
On review aggregator website Rotten Tomatoes, Hide Away holds an approval rating of 46% based on 13 reviews. On Metacritic, it has a weighted average score of 34 out of 100, based on 9 critics, indicating "generally unfavorable reviews".

Joe Leydon of Variety wrote that the film "sails smoothly, if not downright defiantly, far beyond the commercial mainstream". The Hollywood Reporter staff stated that it "offers an unconvincing tale of spiritual recovery" and "expects viewers to come along for the weepy ride but gives us no reason to care about its hero's pain or to cheer his inarticulate path out of it". Drew Taylor of IndieWire called it "a truly lousy movie that does everything it can to suffocate Lucas' very fine performance". Sheri Linden of the Los Angeles Times concluded her review saying director Chris Eyre "conveys a strong sense of place and of solitude, but can't replenish the story's shallows". Stephen Holden of The New York Times described the film as "a ponderous piece of allegorical kitsch about grief and healing".

Awards and nominations

References

External links
 
 

2011 films
2011 drama films
2011 independent films
2010s psychological drama films
American independent films
American psychological drama films
Films about alcoholism
Films about grieving
Films about spirituality
Films about widowhood
Films directed by Chris Eyre
Films set on boats
Films set in Michigan
Films shot in Michigan
2010s English-language films
2010s American films